Yahaan is a 2005 Indian Hindi war drama, romance film jointly produced by Sahara One Motion Pictures and Red Ice Films with Shoojit Sircar as the director in his directorial debut. The film stars Jimmy Sheirgill, Minissha Lamba (in her film debut) and Yashpal Sharma in lead roles and had its theatrical release on 29 July 2005. Yahaan was also screened at the 7th Ocean's Cinefan Film Festival where it was awarded with the Special Jury Prize.

Plot
Kashmir is in turmoil because of terrorists trying to take over the land and the Indian army trying to find and eliminate them. Army commander Aman meets Adaa when posted to Kashmir to fight the insurgents. Adaa lives with her father, grandmother and a mute adopted sister. Adaa's brother Shakeel has joined hands with the terrorists. Circumstances soon lead to Aman and Adaa falling in love. Aman does not let the army know about his new relationship. He is given the task of finding and eliminating terrorists; he captures their leader, who happens to be Shakeel's mentor. Adaa's family learns about her affair with Aman. Her grandmother approves of the relationship, but her father requests Aman to stay away from them, as their love will not be approved in that place.

A disappointed Aman is then given another mission. Acting on a tip, he and his men go to raid a terrorist hideout but are attacked by the terrorists. Many insurgents are killed, and Aman and four comrades are taken captive by Shakeel. They demand the release of their leader from the government in exchange for the soldiers. But Adaa finds her brother's hideout, goes there, and pleads with him not to harm Aman. Using the opportunity, Aman breaks free and escapes with Adaa, just as the army besieges the place and rescues the captured army men.

Now Aman and Adaa's affair becomes known to the army. Suspicion falls on Aman that he is in cahoots with the terrorists, as he is not at their hideout, and he has run off with Adaa. As soon as he arrives in the city, he is arrested and court-martialed. Adaa does all she can to help Aman. She goes to the chief minister, who agrees to help her but on the condition that she deny any relationship with Aman in public, as it can affect the reputation of the army. Adaa does not agree to that. Instead, on the advice of her mute sister, writes a letter to the prime minister, telling him her story and seeking help for Aman. As fate would have it, she is called by a TV channel for a live interview and to tell her story to the world. This news spreads, and the terrorists are irked. They advise Shakeel to put an end to it all: He takes over a mosque, holding people hostage in exchange for their leader and Adaa's silence. They also bomb Adaa's house (at their leader's orders), injuring her grandmother gravely. Adaa decides to broadcast her story live, no matter what. Shakeel demands from the government that he negotiate with the man who had a relationship with his sister: Aman.

In the climax, Aman enters the mosque alone and faces Shakeel. Shakeel beats him black and blue, then sees that his father is one of the hostages in the mosque. At the same time, Adaa tells her story live on TV. Everyone listens to the heart-wrenching tale of the two lovers and a plea for Shakeel to return. Aman tells Shakeel that the terrorist leader had bombed Shakeel's house and his grandmother is in hospital. The terrorists then decide to leave, holding a man and a few hostages as guard. As soon as they step out, pre-planned by Aman who is wearing a bulletproof jacket, a sniper commando shoots him. He falls from the impact, thus giving the sniper a chance to aim at other terrorists. The army invades and forces the other terrorists to surrender. In the end, Adaa arrives and they leave the scene together.

Cast

Jimmy Sheirgill as Captain Aman
Minissha Lamba as Adaa
Yashpal Sharma as Shakeel Ahmed
Banwari Taneja as Alsami, Terrorist Head
Mukesh Tiwari as Major Rathod
Saurabh Dubey (actor) as Army Commander 
Dolly Ahluwalia as Adaa's grandmother
Gyan Prakash as Adaa's father
Nimrat Kaur as Journalist
Harish Khanna (actor) as Majid
Gajraj Rao as Home Minister
Neeraj Sood

Music

The soundtrack album of Yahaan consists of 5 songs, 2 remixes and a theme track. Shantanu Moitra and Nizami Bandhu composed the songs, which were written by Gulzar and Nizami Bandhu, while the remixes and theme track were done by Sameeruddin and Abhishek Arora, who have also composed the background score of the film. The soundtrack album was launched on 24 June 2005 on Times Music while on digital platforms the album was made available on 9 August 2005. Aakash Gandhi of Planet Bollywood praised the soundtrack and gave it a rating of 8.5 out of 10 in his music review.

Response

Yahaan was released along with director Kabir Kaushik's Sehar on 29 July 2005. However, due to heavy rains in Mumbai on 26 July 2005, both the movies performed poorly at box office. Critics praised the film for being warm and intimate.

Critical reception

Anupama Chopra of India Today praised the acting performance of Jimmy Shergill and the direction of Shoojit Sircar but criticized the slow pacing of the film and it's climax which she felt was unconvincing. Raja Sen of Rediff appreciated the realistic nature of the film along with the acting performances of all actors but was critical of the film's "oversimplified" conclusion. Taran Adarsh of Bollywood Hungama praised the performances of Jimmy Shergill and debutant Minissha Lamba but felt that the film suffers from a weak screenplay and slow pacing. Taran gave the film a rating of 1.5 out of 5. Alok Kumar of Planet Bollywood praised the acting performances of the lead actors and the cinematography of the film and gave the film a rating of 9 out of 10 saying that "Yahaan is moving and original".

Accolades
Star Screen Award for Best Lyrics (Won) - "Naam Adaa Likhna" (Gulzar)
Star Screen Award for Best Film - Robby Grewal
Star Screen Award for Best Director - Shoojit Sircar
Star Screen Award for Best Actress - Minnisha Lamba
Star Screen Award for Playback Singer Male - "Naam Adaa Likhna" (Shaan)
Star Screen Award for Playback Singer Female - "Naam Adaa Likhna" (Shreya Ghoshal)
Screen Award for Best Lyricist - "Naam Adaa Likhna" (Gulzar)

References

External links 

 

2005 films
Indian war drama films
Indian Army in films
Films about terrorism in India
2000s Hindi-language films
Films set in Jammu and Kashmir
Films shot in Jammu and Kashmir
Films scored by Shantanu Moitra
Films directed by Shoojit Sircar
Kashmir conflict in films